Shushtari may refer to:
 Shushtari, Khuzestan
 Shushtari, Kurdistan
 Abu al-Hasan al-Shushtari 13th-century Andalusian poet